Alucita klimeschi is a moth of the family Alucitidae. It is found on Cyprus. It has also been recorded from Turkey and Russia.

References

Moths described in 1997
Alucitidae
Moths of Europe
Moths of Asia